Hilary Davidson is a Canadian and American novelist and journalist. Her novels include The Damage Done (2010), The Next One to Fall (2012), Evil in All Its Disguises (2013), Blood Always Tells (2014), One Small Sacrifice (2019), Don't Look Down (2020), and Her Last Breath (2021). She is also a prolific author of short stories, for which she has won multiple awards.

Early life 
Davidson graduated from the University of Toronto in 1994.  After graduation she worked at Harper's Magazine in New York, Canadian Living magazine in Toronto, and went on to become a full-time freelance writer. Between 2000 and 2010, she authored or co-authored 17 books for Frommer's Travel Guides. In 2010 she published The Damage Done.  It won the Anthony Award for best first novel of 2010.  She has subsequently published several more novels.

Davidson was born in Toronto, Canada. She moved to New York City in October 2001. She is a dual citizen of Canada and the US.

Novels

The Lily Moore Series 
The Damage Done (2010) 
The Next One to Fall (2012) 
Evil in All Its Disguises (2013)

The Shadows of New York Series 
One Small Sacrifice (2019) 
Don't Look Down (2020)

Standalone 
Blood Always Tells (2014) 
Her Last Breath (2021) ISBN 978-1542028691

Awards

Awards Won 

 2018 Anthony Award for Best Short Story for "My Side of the Matter" 
 2015 Derringer Award for Best Long Story for "A Hopeless Case"
 2011 Anthony Award for Best First Novel for The Damage Done
 2010 Spinetingler Award for Best Short Story for "Insatiable"

Award Nominations 

 2020 Anthony Award for Best Short Story for "Unforgiven" 
 2018 Arthur Ellis Award for Best Short Story for "Jerusalem Syndrome"
 2017 Derringer Award for Best Long Story for "Swan Song"
 2016 Anthony Award for Best Short Story for "The Siege"
 2016 Arthur Ellis Award for Best Short Story for "The Siege"
 2013 Derringer Award for Best Short Story for "A Special Kind of Hell"

References

21st-century Canadian novelists
21st-century Canadian women writers
Canadian women novelists
Canadian travel writers
Living people
Anthony Award winners
21st-century American novelists
American crime fiction writers
American mystery novelists
Writers from Toronto
University of Toronto alumni
Year of birth missing (living people)